Terms of My Surrender is an album by John Hiatt, released in July 2014 through the record label New West Records. It was produced by Doug Lancio. The album was nominated for two Grammy Awards in 2014.

Track listing
All tracks written by John Hiatt.
 "Long Time Comin'" – 4:12
 "Face of God" – 3:42
 "Marlene" – 3:01
 "Wind Don't Have to Hurry" – 3:47
 "Nobody Knew His Name" – 4:25
 "Baby's Gonna Kick" – 4:07
 "Nothin' I Love" – 4:23
 "Terms of My Surrender" – 3:29
 "Here to Stay" – 3:55
 "Old People" – 4:30
 "Come Back Home" – 3:07

Personnel
 John Hiatt – vocals, guitar, harmonica
 Doug Lancio – banjo, guitar, mandolin
 Nathan Gehri – bass
 Jon Coleman – keyboards
 Kenneth Blevins – drums, percussions
 Brandon Young – background vocals

Chart performance

References

John Hiatt albums
New West Records albums
2014 albums